Konstantin Mikhaylovich Staniukovich or Stanyukovich (March 30, 1843 – May 20, 1903)  was a Russian writer, remembered today mostly for his stories of the Russian Imperial Navy.

Biography

Early life
The son of an admiral Mikhail Nikolaievich Staniukovich, he was enrolled in the Imperial Naval School. When he expressed his desire to pursue a literary rather than a naval career, his father engineered his immediate assignment, before graduation, to a long voyage "to clear his head of nonsense". After the three-year tour ended, by which time he was graduated ship-board and twice promoted to full ensign, he nonetheless resigned from the Navy, was disowned by his family, and embarked on his career as a writer in the liberal camp of 1860s Russia.

Career
By the early 1880s he had gained moderate acclaim for his writing on social issues. Arrested in 1885 for illegal contact with exiles in Western Europe and banished for three years to Siberia, he turned to his twenty-year-old memories of the Navy. Recycling the same cast of characters and the same stock situations over and over, but each time from a slightly different point of view, over the following two decades he created an opus of sea yarns still read today.

The sea stories tell of kind captains and of cruel ones, of efficient first officers and of the indifferent, of idealistic lieutenants and of the careerists, of terrible boatswains and of the harmless—though all curse throughout. An admiral of ridiculous volatility makes several cameo appearances, stunning the officers, the crews, and the reader with his tantrums, and all else notwithstanding, with his deep love and respect for the sea and his charges. Shipwrecks, female passengers, adventures in distant America, shipboard duels act as foils for the plots. And through it all the sea and the air are rendered vividly, as the ordinary seamen tell their yarns, in lovingly rendered vernacular.

These are not the tales of Hornblower. A navy at peace is described, and though one suspects that it will not win many battles, one knows it will scuttle itself inexorably, so as not to surrender.

Legacy
Staniukovich died already famous. His political views ensured that he continued to be reprinted throughout the Soviet period, and a ten-volume edition of his collected works in 1977 had a print run of 375,000.

Notes

English translations

Bobtail, and The Convict, (Stories), from Little Russian Masterpieces, Volume 4, G.P. Putnam's Sons, 1920.
Running to the Shrouds: Russian Sea Stories, Forest Books, 1996.
Maximka: Sea Stories, Foreign Languages Publishing House, Moscow.

Major Russian editions

К.М. Станюкович. Собрание сочинений в 13-ти томах. изд. А.А. Карцева, М., 1897–1900, 1902K.M. Staniukovich. Collected works in 13 volumes. A.A.Kartsev, Pub., Moscow, 1897–1900, 1902
К.М. Станюкович. Собрание сочинений в 6 томах. Гослитиздат, М., 1958K.M. Staniukovich. Collected works in 6 volumes. State Publishing House for Literature, Moscow, 1958
К.М. Станюкович. Собрание сочинений в 10 томах. изд. «Правда», М., 1977K.M. Staniukovich. Collected works in 10 volumes. Pravda Publishers, Moscow, 1977

References

External links 
Biography in Russian

1843 births
1903 deaths
Maritime writers
Russian male novelists
Russian male short story writers
Pushkin Prize winners
Russian exiles
Writers from Sevastopol
19th-century novelists from the Russian Empire
19th-century short story writers from the Russian Empire
19th-century male writers from the Russian Empire